Weeton is a village and civil parish in the Harrogate district of North Yorkshire, England.

The name is first attested in the Domesday Book of 1086 as Widetun(e)/Wideton(e) and seems to derive from Old English wiðig 'willow' and tūn 'settlement, estate, farm', thus meaning 'willow farm'.

Located between Otley and Harrogate it is close to the River Wharfe. Largely populated by commuters working in Leeds and Bradford, it is accessed from the A61 (Leeds-Harrogate road) or the A658 (Harrogate-Bradford road). Weeton has no pub, shop or post office. It is home to the Weeton Agricultural Show and Weeton and Huby Cricket Club.

The village church is called St Barnabas and was built at the cost of the Earl of Harewood. The foundation stone was laid in 1851 by the Bishop of Ripon and construction was completed in 1852. The nearby parsonage was built in 1853. The first three vicars were the Rev. James Palmes, the Rev. T.H. Fearon and, from 1867, the Rev. Christopher Wybergh.

The village is the subject of a booklet by Joan Coombs.

To the south east of Weeton, Rougemont Castle is an example of a well-preserved ringwork, located above the north bank of the River Wharfe, where the river turns in a right-angle at its confluence with Weeton Beck.

References

External links 

The Weeton Agricultural Show

Villages in North Yorkshire
Civil parishes in North Yorkshire